The Adams County Courthouse in Brighton, Colorado, located at 22 S 4th Ave., was built in 1906, and housed the judicial functions of Adams County until the 1970s when the legislation moved out and the building became the Brighton City Hall.  It was listed on the National Register of Historic Places in 2006.

, it was serving as the Brighton City Hall.

Its original portion is a two-and-a-half-story brick building built in 1906. The building was nearly doubled in area in 1939 in a Public Works Administration-funded expansion which used matching materials. The expansion created a monumental pedimented Classical Revival entrance with Tuscan columns on the west side of the building.

The original building was designed by John James Huddart and built by contractor A.B. McDonald.  Denver architects Lester L. Jones and
Richard O. Parry designed the expansion.

References

City and town halls in Colorado
County courthouses in Colorado
National Register of Historic Places in Adams County, Colorado
Neoclassical architecture in Colorado
Government buildings completed in 1906
Government buildings on the National Register of Historic Places in Colorado
1906 establishments in Colorado